Ilie Enciu (born 24 December 1924) was a Romanian weightlifter. He competed in the men's middleweight event at the 1952 Summer Olympics.

References

External links

1924 births
Year of death missing
Romanian male weightlifters
Olympic weightlifters of Romania
Weightlifters at the 1952 Summer Olympics
Sportspeople from Bucharest